William Henry Hugh Cholmondeley, 3rd Marquess of Cholmondeley (31 March 1800 – 16 December 1884), styled Lord Henry Cholmondeley from 1815 until 1870, was a British peer and Conservative Member of Parliament.

Family and education

Cholmondeley was the younger of two sons born to George, Fourth Earl of Cholmondeley, who was created the first Marquess of Cholmondeley in 1815. His mother was Lady Georgiana Charlotte, second daughter and co-heir of Peregrine Bertie, 3rd Duke of Ancaster and Kesteven. He was a direct descendant of Sir Robert Walpole, the first Prime Minister of Great Britain.

Like his grandfather, and his elder brother, Cholmondeley was educated at Eton. He then attended Christ Church, Oxford, but apparently left without a degree, as was relatively common among his generation. Cholmondeley's elder brother, George, succeeded to his father's title in 1827 as the 2nd Marquess of Cholmondeley.

Career
In 1822, Cholmondeley was elected to the House of Commons for Castle Rising, a seat he held until 1832, when the constituency was abolished by the Reform Bill. He remained out of Parliament for the next twenty years. In 1852, Cholmondeley was again successful for South Hampshire, representing it for the next five years until 1857.

Cholmondeley was a member of the Canterbury Association from 27 March 1848.

In 1870, Cholmondeley succeeded to his elder brother's title as the third Marquess of Cholmondeley and entered the House of Lords.

Marriage and issue

On 28 February 1825, Cholmondeley married Marcia Emma Georgiana Arbuthnot, daughter of Charles Arbuthnot, at Cholmondeley House, which was then in Piccadilly, London. They had eight children, of whom only two daughters survived him:
 Marcia Charlotte Emma Cholmondeley (22 November 1826 – 7 April 1828)
 Lady Charlotte Georgiana Cholmondeley (4 February 1828 – 17 August 1912)
 Charles George Cholmondeley (9 July 1829 – 7 December 1869)
 Lady Marcia Susan Harriet Cholmondeley (18 April 1831 – 10 June 1927)
 Lord Henry Vere Cholmondeley (4 October 1834 – 25 February 1882)
 Emma Caroline Cholmondeley (11 November 1837 – 26 January 1839)
 Caroline Rachel Cholmondeley (4 July 1840 – 11 March 1863)

Lands and estates

The family seats are Houghton Hall, Norfolk, and Cholmondeley Castle, which is surrounded by a  estate near Malpas, Cheshire.

The Marquess was a teetotal Quaker and closed all the alehouses on the estate.

Position at court
One moiety part of the ancient office of Lord Great Chamberlain is a Cholmondeley inheritance. This hereditary honour came into the Cholmondeley family through the marriage of the first Marquess of Cholmondeley to Lady Georgiana Charlotte Bertie, daughter of Peregrine Bertie, 3rd Duke of Ancaster and Kesteven. The second, fourth, fifth, sixth and seventh holders of the marquessate have all held this office, but Lord William did not take on the responsibilities of this court function.

Death and succession
Cholmondeley's wife died in 1878. Six years after her death, he himself died at Houghton Hall, aged 84. As both of his sons had died before him, Cholmondeley was succeeded in his titles by his grandson George, Earl of Rocksavage, who was the eldest son of his eldest son, Charles.

Houghton Hall was leased out after his death in 1884 until 1916, after which it was restored by the 5th Viscount. Cholmondeley Castle was occupied by the 4th Marquess, who was fatally injured there.

References

External links 
 
 Houghton Hall
  Cholmondeley Castle

1800 births
1884 deaths
Conservative Party (UK) MPs for English constituencies
People educated at Eton College
Tory MPs (pre-1834)
UK MPs 1820–1826
UK MPs 1826–1830
UK MPs 1830–1831
UK MPs 1831–1832
UK MPs 1852–1857
UK MPs who inherited peerages
William Henry Hugh
Members of the Canterbury Association
3
People from Houghton, Norfolk